Deliquescence is a 2017 limited-edition, and the overall ninth, live album by American experimental rock band Swans. The album, limited to 3,000 CD-only copies, contains three tracks that have previously only been played live. The packaging for the CD release includes the details of where each show was held, band photos, and alternative artwork.

At 155 minutes long, Deliquescence is the longest release by the band to date.

Track listing

References

2017 live albums
Swans (band) live albums
Albums produced by Michael Gira
Young God Records live albums